The 1900 Open Championship was the 40th Open Championship, held 6–7 June at the Old Course at St Andrews, Fife, Scotland. J.H. Taylor won the Championship for the 3rd time, by eight strokes from runner-up Harry Vardon.

All entries played 36 holes on the first day with all those within 19 strokes of the leader making the cut and playing 36 holes on the final day, with the additional provision that the final day's field had to contain at least 32 professionals. The prize money for first place was increased from £30 to £50 while that for second place was increased from £20 to £25.

A strong breeze made scoring difficult on the first morning. Taylor together with Harry and Tom Vardon led with scores of 79. In the afternoon only Taylor, with a 77, broke 80. At the end of day, Taylor led on 156 followed by Harry Vardon on 160, Jack White on 161 and the amateur Robert Maxwell on 162. 46 players made the cut of 175.

Playing steadily, Taylor had a third round 78 to open up a six shot lead over Harry Vardon. Braid and White were a further three shots behind. He was even better in the afternoon, scoring 75, to win by eight strokes over Vardon and by 13 shots from the rest of the field. Taylor was the lowest or equal lowest scorer in each of the four rounds.

First day leaderboard
Wednesday, 6 June 1900

Final leaderboard
Source:

Thursday, 7 June 1900

References

External links
St Andrews 1900 (Official site)

The Open Championship
Golf tournaments in Scotland
Open Championship
Open Championship
Open Championship